James Mangles (27 July 1768 – 25 September 1838) was an English merchant and politician.

Life and career
The son of Robert Mangles, a ship chandler in Wapping, he went into his father's business together with his brother John. He was also a shipowner in partnership with his brothers John (1760–1837), Timothy (1729–1795) and Robert (1732–1788). They owned at least four vessels that were employed in the South Sea whale fishery.

During the 1830s he bought Down Place, Surrey, from Edward Turnour, 3rd Earl Winterton. He became a director of the East India Company and served as High Sheriff of Surrey (1808–1809).

Family
Mangles married Mary Hughes of Guildford. There were six sons and six daughters of the marriage, with ten surviving to adulthood.

The eldest, Caroline, born 1792, married in 1815 the Rev. Arthur Onslow, as his second wife.
The eldest son Frederick (1794–1869) married Marion or Marian Scott, daughter of George Scott of Ravenscourt; of Pendell Court, Surrey
Pilgrim (1795–1828), director of the East India Company
Charles Edward (1798–1874) married Rose Newcomb
Emily (1799–1826) married in 1825 Henry Waitby
Ross Donnelly (1801–1877) married in 1830 Harriet Newcomb
Jane (1803–1824)
Ellen (1807–1874) married in 1823 James Stirling.
Albert (1809–1865) married in 1833 Georgiana Scott, daughter of George Scott of Ravenscourt.
Hamilla (born 1812) married in 1833 William Preston R.N.

John Mangles (1760–1837), brother of James Mangles (1762–1838), was father of James Mangles R.N.

Notes

Members of the Parliament of the United Kingdom for English constituencies
1768 births
1838 deaths
British people in whaling
UK MPs 1831–1832
UK MPs 1832–1835
UK MPs 1835–1837